Ueli Hofmann (born September 1, 1953) is a retired Swiss professional ice hockey defenceman who last played for EHC Olten in the National League A. He also represented the Swiss national team at the 1976 Winter Olympics.

References

External links
 
Ueli Hofmann statistics at Sports-Reference.com

Living people
Swiss ice hockey defencemen
1953 births
Ice hockey players at the 1976 Winter Olympics
Olympic ice hockey players of Switzerland
EHC Olten players